Christina Swan (born 3 November 1973) is an Australian television and radio presenter and media personality. Swan hosts The Chrissie Swan Show on Nova FM. In 2022, she served as a judge on The Masked Singer Australia alongside Dave Hughes, Mel B and Abbie Chatfield.

She was the host of Chrissie, Sam and Browny on Nova 100 with Sam Pang and Jonathan Brown, Mix 101.1's afternoon show 3PM Pick-Up and breakfast program Chrissie & Jane with Jane Hall. Swan was a co-host of Network Ten's morning show, The Circle. Swan was a co-host on The Great Australian Spelling Bee. Swan previously hosted television series Can of Worms. Swan made television appearances on All Star Family Feud, The Project, Studio 10, Show Me the Movie!, Have You Been Paying Attention? and Hughesy, We Have a Problem.

Career

Television
Her primary career was in copywriting before appearing on television in 2003 as a contestant on the reality TV series Big Brother where she was the runner-up.

In 2010, Network Ten announced Swan as host of the new morning show The Circle alongside Denise Drysdale, Yumi Stynes and Gorgi Coghlan. The same year, she became a spokesperson for Jenny Craig, appearing in national print and television advertisements.

In 2012, she became the host of the second series of Network Ten's Can of Worms, produced by Cordell Jigsaw Zapruder in association with Watercooler Media. In February 2013, Swan returned as host of the third series.

In February 2015, she appeared on the Network Ten show I'm a Celebrity Get Me Out of Here!, finishing in third place.

In August 2015, she appeared as a co-host of The Great Australian Spelling Bee alongside Grant Denyer.

In March 2016, she became co-host of Long Lost Family on Network 10 alongside comedian Anh Do.

In October 2021, she appeared on the Network 10 show Celebrity MasterChef Australia, being first to be eliminated.

In 2022, she hosted the Australian version on the British comedy panel show, Would I Lie to You? Australia on Network 10. Later in 2022, it was announced that Swan will host a second season of the show set to air in 2023.

In March 2022, Carrie Bickmore announced that she will be taking extended leave from The Project, and it was announced that Swan will fill in and host the show on Monday nights. Swan commenced filling in from Monday 4 April.

In June 2022, Network 10 announced on Instagram that Swan would join the panel on The Masked Singer Australia for its fourth season as a replacement for Urzila Carlson.

Radio
She sought work with breakfast radio in Queensland in late 2003 where she worked at Hot 91.1 (a subsidiary of DMG Radio Australia) with co-host Ronnie Stanton.

She presented the Australian Idol radio show on Nova FM stations across Australia with Mark Holden and Ian Dickson.

She began work at the Vega 91.5 (3PTV) breakfast show alongside Australian Idol judge Ian Dickson and comedian Dave O'Neil in 2007. However, in November 2009, it was announced that Swan would not be returning to Vega 91.5 (now known as Smooth 91.5), due to a cost-cutting measure.

In August 2011, she became co-host of the newly created 3PM Pick-Up on Mix 101.1.

In December 2011, she resigned from The Circle to spend more time with her children and also concentrate on radio. She announced that she would be hosting the breakfast show on Mix 101.1 with Jane Hall and Jamie Row as anchor of the show in 2012.

In October 2015, she was announced as a host of Chrissie, Sam & Browny on Nova 100 with Jonathan Brown and Sam Pang from January 2016.

In January 2023, she started hosting The Chrissie Swan Show on Nova FM.

Other
In March 2012, she was announced as an ambassador for CARE Australia, an organization working with and helping individuals and families in some of the poorest communities in the world.

In 2018, she was appointed the 'Queen of Moomba', Melbourne's largest community festival.

Awards
In 2011, she won Most Popular New Female Talent, and was nominated for Most Popular TV Presenter and the Gold Logie for Most Popular Personality on Australian Television at the 2011 TV Week Logie Awards for her hosting role on The Circle.

In 2012 and 2013, she was nominated for the Most Popular Presenter at the Logies for hosting The Circle, and her role on Can of Worms, respectively.

Personal life

She has three children with her former partner of 15 years, Chris Saville.

In 2021, she opened up about her massive lifestyle changes and health goals. As of 2022 she has lost a total of 90 kilograms.

References

External links
Official Website
The Circle Profile
 

Big Brother (Australian TV series) contestants
Australian game show hosts
Australian women radio presenters
Living people
Logie Award winners
I'm a Celebrity...Get Me Out of Here! (Australian TV series) participants
Radio personalities from Melbourne
1973 births